Peter Joseph Cattaneo MBE (born 1 July 1964) is a British filmmaker. He is most known for directing the comedy film The Full Monty, for which he won the MTV Movie Award for Best New Filmmaker.

Life and career 
Cattaneo was brought up in Twickenham, London. His father was a London-born animator of Italian descent. After attending London College of Printing for an art foundation course, and Leeds Polytechnic for a BA in Graphic Design (Film), he graduated from the Royal College of Art in 1989, he was nominated for the Academy Award for Best Live Action Short Film for Dear Rosie (1990). He went on to make his feature film debut with The Full Monty (1997), which was a smash success both in the UK and internationally. The comedy grossed £160,049,344 at the box office on a £3 million budget and Cattaneo received a nomination for the Academy Award for Best Director.

Cattaneo has since directed several films including Lucky Break (2001), Opal Dream (2006) and The Rocker (2008). He has also directed a multitude of commercials as well as every episode of the award-winning comedy television series Rev. for BBC Two.

He was appointed a Member of the Order of the British Empire (MBE) in the 1998 Birthday Honours "for services to the British Film Industry."

Filmography

Film

Television

References

External links 

1964 births
Alumni of Leeds Beckett University
Alumni of the Northern Film School
Comedy film directors
English male screenwriters
English people of Italian descent
English television directors
European Film Awards winners (people)
Film directors from London
Film producers from London
Italian British film directors
Living people
People from Twickenham
Members of the Order of the British Empire